Adrianus Johannes "Joop" ter Beek (1 June 1901 – 5 September 1934) was a Dutch footballer. He competed in the men's tournament at the 1924 Summer Olympics.

A player of NAC, Ter Beek made one appearance for the Netherlands on 2 June 1924 against Ireland. The setting in which he made his international debut was bleak, as game was played on a practice pitch in front of only a few spectators. Journalists wrote about the match: "Rarely has the national team played so lazily, so listlessly". For Ter Beek, it proved to be the end of an international career, as the cap was his only one.

Ter Beek died on 5 September 1934, aged 33.

References

External links
 

1901 births
1934 deaths
Dutch footballers
Netherlands international footballers
Olympic footballers of the Netherlands
Footballers at the 1924 Summer Olympics
Footballers from Breda
NAC Breda players
Association football forwards